Altham is a village and civil parish in the Borough of Hyndburn, in Lancashire, England. It is the only parish in the borough – the remainder is an unparished area.

The village is located in the north east corner of the parish on the River Calder, and in the south west is Altham West, a suburb of Accrington. The census of 2001 recorded a population for the parish of 897, increasing to 1,137 at the 2011 Census. However the village's 2011 population was only 343.
The Ham class minesweeper HMS Altham was named after the village.

Governance 

Altham is in Hyndburn, a non-metropolitan district with borough status in Lancashire. Altham was once a township in the ancient parish of Whalley, this became a civil parish in 1866. From 1894 to 1974, the parish was in the Burnley Rural District.

Hyndburn Borough Council has a total of 35 councillors, two of which are elected by the ward of Altham. , the ward is represented by two Labour Party councillors.

Altham has a parish council; its meetings are usually in Altham village.  The facilities at Accrington Stanley's Crown Ground stadium have allowed some meetings to be held there, a more convenient location for the residents of Altham West.

Industry 
Coal mining was the major industry in Altham in the 19th and early 20th centuries. After the Leeds and Liverpool Canal was opened in the 1810s, pits were located near the canal, and supplied coal to the industries of East Lancashire.  Later in the century Altham Colliery (later renamed Moorfield Colliery) was opened.

The colliery closed in 1949, and Moorfield Industrial Estate is now on the site. An explosion at the colliery in 1883 resulted in the deaths of 68 people.

Altham is now home to two industrial estates, Altham Industrial Estate within the village and Moorfield Industrial Estate in the southwest of the parish near Clayton-le-Moors.

Education 
Altham St. James C.E. Primary School is located in the village.  The nearest secondary schools are in Accrington.

Religious sites 

Altham has an Anglican church, dedicated to St James and situated on Burnley Road.  The current building, which is Grade II* listed, was built in the 16th century. However, a church has existed in the village since 1140. At first, it was dedicated to St Mary. Until 1870 it was the parish church to Accrington.

Transport 
Altham is on the A678 road; the nearest motorway junctions are M65 junctions 7 (west of Clayton-le-Moors) and 8 (near Huncoat).
As of September 2016, the village is served by only one bus route; the 152 operated by Blackburn Bus Company, which connects the village to Burnley, Blackburn and Preston.

See also
Listed buildings in Altham, Lancashire
Timothy Jollie, nonconformist minister born in Altham circa 1659

Notable People
Ian Ashworth (1958-) professional footballer

References

External links

Villages in Lancashire
Geography of Hyndburn
Civil parishes in Lancashire